One for All Tour is a concert video from The Bee Gees recorded live at the National Tennis Centre in Melbourne, Australia in November 1989. Melbourne was the third final stop on their 1989 One for All World Tour, which included the United States, Europe and Asia the first time the Bee Gees played live there since their 1979 Spirits Having Flown Tour. Originally, this video was released in two volumes on VHS, each 50 minutes apiece. Volume One incorrectly listed the song "My World" from 1972 instead of the song "World" from 1967. In the DVD era, the cover was slightly changed and was released under the title The Very Best of The Bee Gees Live! in 1997.

In 2014, the Melbourne show was made available on CD for the first time as part of a box set chronicling their period on Warner Bros.

In 2018, Eagle Rock Entertainment re-released the concert on blu-ray and DVD in its original aspect ratio under the title One for All Tour: Live in Australia 1989. The audio was presented in a newly mixed and mastered surround sound.

Track listings
 "Ordinary Lives" Album: One
  "Giving Up the Ghost" Album: ESP
 "To Love Somebody" Album: Bee Gees' 1st
 "I've Gotta Get a Message to You" Album: Idea
 "One" Album: One
  "Tokyo Nights" Album: One
 "Words" Album: No Album/Best of Bee Gees (Words - Single)
  "Juliet" (Robin Gibb) Album: How Old Are You?
 "New York Mining Disaster 1941" Album: Bee Gees' 1st
 "Holiday" Album: Bee Gees' 1st
 "Too Much Heaven" Album: Spirits Having Flown
  "Heartbreaker" (Dionne Warwick) Album: Heartbreaker
  "Islands in the Stream" (Kenny Rogers) Album: Eyes That See in the Dark
 "Run to Me" Album: To Whom It May Concern
 "World" Album: Horizontal
 "Spicks and Specks" Album: Spicks and Specks
 "Lonely Days" Album: 2 Years On
 "How Deep Is Your Love" Album: Saturday Night Fever
  "It's My Neighborhood" Album: One
 "How Can You Mend a Broken Heart" Album: Trafalgar
  "House of Shame" Album: One
 "I Started a Joke" Album: Idea
 "Massachusetts" Album: Horizontal
 "Stayin' Alive" Album: Saturday Night Fever
 "Nights on Broadway" Album: Main Course
 "Jive Talkin'" Album: Main Course
 "You Win Again" Album: ESP
 "You Should Be Dancing" Album: Children of the World

Personnel
 Barry Gibb - vocals, guitar
 Robin Gibb - vocals
 Maurice Gibb - vocals, keyboard, guitar
 Alan Kendall - lead guitar
 Tim Cansfield - guitar
 Vic Martin - keyboard, synthesizer
 Gary Moberly - keyboard, synthesizer
 George Perry - bass
 Mike Murphy - drums
 Tampa Lann, Linda Harmon, Phyllis St. James - Backup singers and percussionists

References

Bee Gees